Rocklands Station is a pastoral lease that operates as a cattle station along the border of the Northern Territory and Queensland in the Barkly Tableland region.

The property shares a boundary with Adder and Avon Downs Station to the west, Alexandria Station to the north and Austral Downs to the south. The Herbert River flows through the middle of the property. The Barkly Highway runs through the southern end of the property.

The  property was acquired by the Paraway Pastoral Company from the Western Grazing Company in 2016 along with Tanbar Station for 130 million. The property was stocked with 35,000 head of Brahman, Brahman cross Santa, Charbray and Senegus cattle.

Western Grazing acquired Rocklands, from the Stanbroke Pastoral Company, in 2004 at the same time Tanbar.

Rocklands was established at some time prior to 1878 when it was owned by Crosthwaite.

See also
List of ranches and stations

References

Stations (Australian agriculture)
Pastoral leases in the Northern Territory
Pastoral leases in Queensland